Robert Henry McIntosh (23 September 1894–1983), also known as All-Weather Mac for his ability to fly in foggy and difficult conditions, was one of Imperial Airways' 16 original pilots. In 1927, he made unsuccessful attempts to fly at first across the Atlantic with James Fitzmaurice and then to fly to India and back with Bert Hinkler, both on the aircraft Princess Xenia, a Dutch Fokker F.VIIa.

References 

1894 births
1983 deaths
British aviators
Croydon Airport
Imperial Airways